Manabu Mima (born September 19, 1986) is a Japanese professional baseball pitcher for the Chiba Lotte Marines of the Nippon Professional Baseball(NPB). He played for the Tohoku Rakuten Golden Eagles.

Career
Mima attended Fujishiro High School and Chuo University. Mima pitched for Tokyo Gas in the industrial leagues after college. The Rakuten Golden Eagles chose him in the second round of the 2010 NPB draft. He then joined the Japanese national baseball team for the 2010 Asian Games. Mima's repertoire includes a slider, forkball, curveball, shuuto (two-seamer), and a fastball (tops out at 95 mph). He debuted on April 13, 2011, tossing a scoreless 8th to preserve a 5–1 lead over the Chiba Lotte Marines.

In the 2013 season, Mima had a 6–5 win–loss record and a 4.12 earned run average. Mima was the winning pitcher in Games 3 and 7 of the 2013 Japan Series, and was named the Japan Series Most Valuable Player (MVP).

On November 25, 2019, Mima signed with the Chiba Lotte Marines.

Personal life
His wife is Japanese singer Anna.

References

External links

1986 births
Living people
Asian Games bronze medalists for Japan
Asian Games medalists in baseball
Baseball players at the 2010 Asian Games
Chiba Lotte Marines players
Chuo University alumni
Japanese baseball players
Medalists at the 2010 Asian Games
Nippon Professional Baseball pitchers
Baseball people from Ibaraki Prefecture
Tohoku Rakuten Golden Eagles players